Thermasporomyces composti is a Gram-positive and thermophilic bacterium from the genus Thermasporomyces which has been isolated from compost on Japan.

References

External links 
Type strain of Thermasporomyces composti at BacDive -  the Bacterial Diversity Metadatabase

Propionibacteriales
Bacteria described in 2011
Thermophiles